
Gmina Tułowice is an urban-rural gmina (administrative district) in Opole County, Opole Voivodeship, in south-western Poland.

Villages
Apart from the town of Tułowice, Gmina Tułowice contains the villages and settlements of Goszczowice, Ligota Tułowicka, Skarbiszowice, Szydłów and Tułowice.

Neighbouring communes
Commune Tułowice is bordered by the communes of Dąbrowa, Komprachcice, Korfantów, Łambinowice, Niemodlin and Prószków.

Twin towns – sister cities

Gmina Tułowice is twinned with:
 Bělá pod Pradědem, Czech Republic
 Wendeburg, Germany

References

Commune Tulowice